The men's 200 metres event at the 2006 African Championships in Athletics was held at the Stade Germain Comarmond on August 12–13.

Medalists

Results

Heats
Wind: Heat 1: -3.6 m/s, Heat 2: -3.5 m/s, Heat 3: -2.3 m/s, Heat 4: -2.2 m/s, Heat 5: -5.1 m/s

Semifinals
Wind: Heat 1: -1.1 m/s, Heat 2: -1.8 m/s

Final
Wind: -1.5 m/s

References
Results 

2006 African Championships in Athletics
200 metres at the African Championships in Athletics